Astrakhan State Technical University (ASTU) is a technical university located in Astrakhan, Russia.

History 
Federal State Educational Institution of Higher Professional Education "Astrakhan State Technical University" is the legal successor of the Astrakhan Technical Institute of Fishing Industry and Economy, established in accordance with the Order of the People's Commissariat of Foreign and Domestic Trade of the USSR from May 9, 1930 № 695 "On fish schools, colleges, rybfakah and courses".

Order of the Russian Federation State Committee for Higher Education on June 3, 1994 № 547 "On the renaming of the Astrakhan Technical Institute of Fishing Industry and Economy" and the order of the Russian Federation of 08.07.1994 Goskorybolovstva, № 107 "On the renaming of the institutions of the Astrakhan and Kaliningrad, the fishing industry and the economy technical universities in the state, Astrakhan technical Institute of Fishing industry and economy renamed to Astrakhan State technical University.

Faculties 
 Institute of Economics
 Institute of Information Technology and Communications
 Mechanical Engineering Institute
 Institute for Fisheries, Biology and Nature
 Faculty of Law
 Faculty of Civil Engineering
 Faculty of vocational education
 Branch Dmitrovsky
 Institute of Distance Education
 Institute for Advanced Professional Education
 Institute for the Humanities
 Institute of Oil and Gas
 Institute of Marine Technology, Energy and Transport
 Preparatory Faculty for Foreign Citizens
 Volga-Caspian Sea Fishing College
 Yeisk Sea Fishing College
 Fishing Dmitrovsky College

External links 
 

Universities in Volga Region

Technical universities and colleges in Russia